The City Angels group is an independent, multiethnic, gay-friendly and anti-racist group of street volunteers, founded in 1994 in Milan by Mario Furlan, an Italian journalist, writer and university professor of motivation and personal growth. The group is also present in Rome, Turin, Brescia, Bergamo, Cagliari, Parma, Busto Arsizio, Gallarate, Voghera, Palermo, Monza, Campomarino, Novara, Como, Varese, Genoa, Albenga, Savona, Lecco and Lecce; since 2014, they have also been active in Lugano, Mendrisio and Chiasso, Switzerland.
In Milan, the City Angels have twice received the "Ambrogino d'Oro", the city's highest official recognition. In 2008, the Ambrogino was awarded to the honorary City Angel Edward "Eddie" Gardner, a Ghanaian man who risked dying on July 20 of that year after being stabbed, in a racist attack, by three drug dealers shouting "dirty nigger!" because he was trying to convince young people not to take drugs.

Activities

City Angels are volunteers who assist citizens and homeless in emergency and distress, by helping those who are marginalized: homeless, immigrants, drug addicts and the elderly. They are the only non-profit association in Italy also involved in preventing and fighting street crime, in cooperation with law enforcement agents. In Milan, they run "Casa Silvana", the only home for families open all night and even hosting the homeless animals; and they also run other two shelters for the homeless, one just for men and the other also for women and families. They generally operate in areas with major social problems, which in many cities is usually around the railway stations. They also operate on public transport, to enhance security and to help passengers. 

The City Angels have been working closely for many years with the institutions, which often contact them to open new chapters. The President of the Republic, Giorgio Napolitano, has received them in his Quirinale office on December 9, 2009, and has complimented them, saying they represent, as volunteers, "the best of Italy". Pope Benedict XVIth has called them "Scouts of the XXIst century".

City Angels have always publicly expressed their opposition to vigilante groups. "Vigilantes - Mario Furlan explains - are in search of the enemy. We are in search of people to help."

Among City Angel activities are:
 help the homeless, by distributing food, clothes, blankets and sleeping bags, accompanying them in shelters and huddle with them a relationship of friendship and trust
 help drug addicts and alcoholics, directing them toward a detoxification pathway
 help prostitutes, through the distribution of condoms used to get in touch with them and convince them to turn to gated communities and to denounce their exploiters
 give a "good example", acting to instill civic sense in the others
 help immigrants, helping them to become integrated in the society
 help the elderly, carrying out a daily monitoring service and distribution of meals to 300 elderly people living alone in the sole city of Milan
 help disabled people, accompanying them on the road
 contrast, due to their uniform, crime
 help victims of crime, carrying out a service of the territory in the most "risky" areas and providing an escort service for those who are afraid to walk alone in certain areas (especially women and the elderly)
 act in case of crime and call the police when it is needed
 help the prisoners, serving in prisons for detainees from the moment they enter the prison
 help students involved in middle and high schools to hold meetings on the issue of combating drugs and bullying
 help the animals, by taking action every time an animal is mistreated or abandoned and promoting initiatives to raise public awareness about the love for animals and nature.
In Switzerland the Angels are particularly active in helping the disabled and the elderly. In Chiasso, at the border with Italy, they help the border police.
The City Angels of Italy and Switzerland are founding members of Eunwa (European neighbourhood watch association), based in Vienna, Austria.

City Angel uniform

City Angels are required to wear a uniform that is designed to make them recognizable by the "road users", i.e. immigrants, homeless, drug addicts, alcoholics but also by ordinary citizens and tourists that can ask Angels for help.

Their uniform consists of: 
 black sneakers or black boots, useful to walk through broken glass, syringes and mud
 black trousers with pockets, to hold the equipment of the volunteer
 red shirt / sweatshirt / jacket, with the emblem of the City Angels (red color = emergency)
 blue beret with the badge of the City Angels (blue = color of peace)

The uniform of the City Angels, along with other information about City Angels, is exhibited since May 2009 in the Museo del Risorgimento in Milan.

Emblem

The City Angels' emblem is an eagle with outstretched wings, protecting a city skyline. The eagle represents courage, foresight, nobility of the soul. Above this symbol are the words "City Angels" and below is the mission of the association, "Solidarity and Security".

Training course

The Angels are mostly between 18 and 45 years, of all nationalities (there is no upper age limit); 50.8% of them are women, 27% are immigrants. They do not carry any weapon. They wear a red shirt or jacket and the blue beret of the United Nations, to emphasize the fact of being a force for peace.

Volunteers have to be well trained, brave and balanced. To become a City Angel a candidate has to undergo a training course lasting two months, for a total of 16 lessons, twice a week. After passing an aptitude test, the candidate has to compile the application for admission, pay an annual insurance fee and handle the following documents: certificate of good health, passport photos, photocopy of identity card. Twelve classes are held in twelve lessons in gym (compulsory attendance). In class, concepts like first aid, alcohol and drug addiction are explained; also, rules of procedure and legal, psychology and communication concepts are taught. In the gym, lessons on teamwork and self-defense techniques are given. The self-defense used by City Angels is called Wilding, has been created by the founder Mario Furlan and is based on psychology and instinct.
Those who finish the course may take the final exam: before passing the final exam a candidate is not yet a City Angel, but an "auxiliary", and circulates with a bib instead of the red shirt. 
In an average of ten aspiring volunteers, three pass an aptitude test, two come to the final exam and one passes it. As the president and founder Mario Furlan says, "we are interested in quality, rather than quantity, of our volunteers."

Public initiatives

From their birth, City Angels have been organizing public initiatives to promote tolerance, solidarity, anti-racism and brotherhood among people. Among their events, the multi-religious prayer the day before Christmas and Easter in the Milan Central Station in front of the Shoah Memorial: representatives of various religions (priests, imams, rabbis, Protestant pastors, ...) pray together in the middle of the homeless.
Another event is the "Angel Day" at the main Milan soup kitchen: a day in which the mayor, together with political leaders and with television, entertainment, sports and culture stars, wear the uniform of the Angels and act as waiters to the homeless.

Awards and prizes

The City Angels have received several awards in their history by the institutions. Among these the most important are:

 1999: "Ambrogino d'Oro", the most important recognition in the City of Milan
 2000: Motta Goodness Award
 2007: Paul Harris Award of the Rotary Club International to Mario Furlan, founder of City Angels 
 2008: "Ambrogino d'Oro" (to the honorary City Angel Eddy Gardner)
 2008: Ambassador for Peace Award of the World Peace Organisation
 2009: The Gift of Humanity Award
 2013: Carlo Porta Award
 2018: Gold medal of the City of Bergamo
 2019: "Bronzi di Riace" award to Mario Furlan, founder of City Angels

External links
 Official Italian site
 Official Swiss site

References

Non-profit organisations based in Italy
Volunteer cooperatives
Community development organizations
Civil crime prevention